The 1931 Rose Bowl was the 17th Rose Bowl game, an American post-season college football game that was played on New Year's Day in Pasadena, California. It featured two undefeated teams, Alabama and Washington State.

Alabama scored three touchdowns in the second quarter and shut out the Cougars, 24–0.

Game notes
For a psychological stunt, the WSC Cougars dressed all in red (helmets, jerseys, pants, socks, and shoes), according to the Pasadena Tournament of Roses.

References

External links
Official game program

1930–31 NCAA football bowl games
1930
1930
1930
1931 in sports in California
January 1931 sports events